Mount Bitgood is a mountain (1,150 m) between Mount Lockhart and Mount Colombo on the north side of the Fosdick Mountains, in the Ford Ranges of Marie Byrd Land. Mapped by United States Antarctic Service (USAS) (1939–41) and by United States Geological Survey (USGS) from surveys and U.S. Navy air photos (1959–65). Named by Advisory Committee on Antarctic Names (US-ACAN) for Charles D. Bitgood, geologist with the United States Antarctic Research Program (USARP) party to the Fosdick Mountains, 1967–68.

Further reading 
 Donna Whitney, Christian Teyssier, Christine S. Siddoway, Gneiss Domes in Orogeny, P 281

References 

Mountains of Marie Byrd Land